Air Uganda serves the following destinations (as of September 2013):

Africa
As of September 2013, Air Uganda maintains regular services to the following destinations:
 Burundi
 Bujumbura – Bujumbura International Airport
 Kenya
 Nairobi – Jomo Kenyatta International Airport
 Mombasa – Moi International Airport
 Rwanda
 Kigali – Kigali International Airport
 Somalia
 Mogadishu – Mogadishu International Airport
 South Sudan
 Juba – Juba International Airport
 Tanzania
 Arusha – Kilimanjaro International Airport
 Dar es Salaam – Julius Nyerere International Airport
 Uganda
 Entebbe – Entebbe International Airport (Main hub)

External links
  Air Uganda Homepage

See also
 Air Uganda

References

Lists of airline destinations